Jonathan Alfred Crocker (8 October 1874 – 21 July 1944) was an English cricketer who played first-class cricket in four matches for Cambridge University in 1894. He was born at Kensington and died at Westminster, both in London.

Crocker was educated at Eton College and Trinity College, Cambridge. As a cricketer, he was played as a lower-order batsman and a second-line bowler in his first-class matches, though it is not known whether he was right- or left-handed, nor what style of bowler he was. He was one of the successes of the 1894 freshmen's cricket trial at Cambridge, taking six wickets for 66 runs in the first innings. His second match for the university in 1894 was his best: against a side raised by A. J. Webbe, he made scores of 29 and 16 and took two wickets in the first innings, though he was not among the eight bowlers used in the Webbe XI's second innings. But he did not succeed in subsequent matches and dropped out of the Cambridge team without being awarded a Blue. He played for Hertfordshire in the year before the Minor Counties Championship was instituted, but never played in a Minor Counties match.

Crocker graduated from Cambridge University in 1897 with a Bachelor of Arts degree and went into business. He served with the 3rd County of London Yeomanry (Sharpshooters) and the City of London Yeomanry (Rough Riders) in the First World War and saw action in France, Egypt and at Gallipoli.

References

External links
 

1874 births
1944 deaths
English cricketers
Cambridge University cricketers
People educated at Eton College
Alumni of Trinity College, Cambridge
British Army personnel of World War I
3rd County of London Yeomanry (Sharpshooters) officers
City of London Yeomanry (Rough Riders) soldiers